Corbett is an unincorporated community on the Columbia River in eastern Multnomah County, Oregon, United States. It is located on the Historic Columbia River Highway (a.k.a. Crown Point Highway) between the Sandy River and Crown Point.

Corbett was named for prominent pioneer Senator Henry W. Corbett. Senator Corbett purchased a farm in the area in 1885. After several name changes, the post office in the area was named "Corbett" in 1895. Corbett's ZIP Code is 97019.

Corbett School District runs the Corbett School and the Corbett Charter School.

Notable people
 Julius Meier, politician
 Billy Oskay, musician
 Patti Smith, politician
 Fritz Springmeier, author
 Dave Stief, football player
 Jeff Lucas, Navy SEAL

References

External links 

Privately owned Corbett community website

Columbia River Gorge
Historic Columbia River Highway
Portland metropolitan area
Unincorporated communities in Multnomah County, Oregon
1895 establishments in Oregon
Populated places established in 1895
Unincorporated communities in Oregon